African Americans in Alabama or Black Alabamians are residents of the state of Alabama who are of African American ancestry. They have a history in Alabama from the era of slavery through the Civil War, emancipation, the Reconstruction era, resurgence of white supremacy with the Ku Klux Klan and Jim Crow Laws, the Civil Right movement, into recent decades.

History

African slaves were brought to Alabama during the slave trade.

Business and finance

In 1890, The Penny Savings Bank, the first black-owned and black-operated financial institution in Alabama, was founded by William R. Pettiford. In 1997, the 19,077 businesses owned by black people in Alabama generated around $1 billion in revenue and employed 13,232 people. Businesses owned by black people made up 6.7% of all non-farm businesses in Alabama placing Alabama ninth in the United States for the percentage of black businesses.

In 2010, 15% of white Alabamians, which was 487,100, were in poverty while 37% of black Alabamians were in poverty, which was 457,900. In 2013, the median household income in Alabama was $42,849, the average white household income was $49,465 while the black household income was $29,210. The national median household income was $52,250, the average white household income was $55,867 while the black household income was $34,815.

Entertainment

In 1914, the Lyric Theatre was created in Birmingham, Alabama, and was one of the first places in the American South where black and white people saw the same shows although black people were in an isolated section.

During the time of Negro league baseball the Birmingham Black Barons was organized in 1920.

Population

Black slaves arrived in present day Alabama during the late 18th and early 19th century in the Mississippi Territory. At the time of the 1800 Census there were 517 black people in the Alabama portion of the Mississippi Territory, with 494 slaves and 23 free blacks. By the time of the 1810 Census the population of black people had risen to 2,624, with 2,565 slaves and 59 free blacks.

In 1817, the Alabama Territory was formed from the Mississippi Territory and was later admitted as a state in 1819. The 1820 Census showed that the population of black people had increased by 1,517.8% to 42,450, with 41,879 slaves and 571 free blacks.

In 1808, the importation of slaves was banned, but the external importation of slaves would continue with the last slave ship, Clotilda, bringing slaves into Alabama in 1860. The last three survivors of the Atlantic slave trade, Cudjoe Lewis, Redoshi, and Matilda McCrear, were all brought to Alabama.

Politics

Appointed and elected officials

In 1870, Benjamin S. Turner, who was born a slave on March 17, 1825, in Weldon, North Carolina, was elected as Alabama's first black member of the United States House of Representatives. Turner would serve until 1873, as he lost reelection in 1872 due to the black vote being split between himself and independent candidate Philip Joseph allowing Democratic nominee Frederick George Bromberg to win.

In 1870, Jeremiah Haralson, who was born a slave on April 1, 1846, in Columbus, Georgia, was elected as the first black member of the Alabama House of Representatives. In 1868, Benjamin F. Royal was elected as the first black member of the Alabama Senate. In 1970, Fred Gray and Thomas Reed became the first black people elected to the Alabama House of Representatives since the end of Reconstruction. In 1992, Sundra Escott-Russell was elected as the first black female member of the Alabama Senate.

In 1947, Oscar Adams established the first black law firm in Birmingham, Alabama, and was later appointed as the first black Justice on the Supreme Court of Alabama. U. W. Clemon, who had aided in the Civil rights movement through lawsuit against discriminatory work practices, was appointed as the first black federal judge in Alabama in 1980.

Andrew Hayden, who was elected as the mayor of Uniontown, Alabama, was the first black person to defeat an incumbent white mayor in Alabama. Richard Arrington Jr., who had served on the Birmingham, Alabama city council from 1971 to 1979, was elected as the city's first black mayor in 1979, and took office in 1980. Steven Reed served as the first black probate judge in Montgomery County, Alabama, and was elected as Montgomery, Alabama's first black mayor in 2019.

Slavery

On December 2, 1865, the Alabama Legislature ratified the 13th Amendment to the United States Constitution which abolished slavery.

Voter registration

In 1901, a new state constitution was created for Alabama. When the convention opened John M. Knox, the chairman of the constitutional convention, stated that “[W]hat is it we want to do? Why it is within the limits imposed by the Federal Constitution, to establish white supremacy in this State,”. Henry Fontaine Reese, a delegate from Selma, Alabama, stated that “When you pay $1.50 for a poll tax, in Dallas County, I believe you disenfranchise 10 Negroes. Give us this $1.50 for educational purposes and for the disenfranchisement of a vicious and useless class.” A poll tax, a literacy test, property requirements, and disqualification for certain criminal convictions were added to the constitution. Following the passage of the constitution black voter registration fell from more than 180,000 in 1900, to less than 3,000 in 1903.

Following the passage of the Civil Rights Act of 1964 the percentage of black registered voters rose from 13.7% in 1960, to 61.3% by 1969. The highest percentage of voter registration between 1960 and 2004 reached its highest amount with 74.3% in 1998.

Following the passage of the Voting Rights Act of 1965 the United States Department of Justice blocked over one hundred voting policy changes in Alabama from 1969 to 2008, and had over eight hundred changed or withdrawn.

On July 25, 2019, Alabama Secretary of State John Merrill announced that 94% of all eligible Alabamians and 96% all of eligible black people in Alabama were registered to vote. However, according to the United States Census Bureau only 69% of all eligible Alabamians and 67.4% of all black people in Alabama were registered to vote.

See also

 History of slavery in Alabama
 African Americans in Mississippi
 Demographics of Alabama
 List of African-American newspapers in Alabama
 Black Belt (region of Alabama)

References

External links

 Black History in Alabama
 African Presence in Alabama
 The Life of the Negro Slave in Alabama